Tea Moderna was a Macedonian woman's weekly magazine women. Magazine ceased to be published in 2017.

History and profile
Tea Moderna was founded by Mile Jovanovski in 2001. The magazine is part of Media Print Macedonia, which was formed by the WAZ group. It covers all topics related to women such as fashion, travel tips and social events.

References

External links
 Official website

2001 establishments in the Republic of Macedonia
Magazines published in North Macedonia
Magazines established in 2001
Women's magazines
Women's fashion magazines
Weekly magazines